Indonesian Adventist University, also known as UNAI, is a private coeducational Christian university in Bandung, West Java in Indonesia. It is operated by the Seventh-day Adventist church.

It is a part of the Seventh-day Adventist education system, the world's second largest Christian school system.

History
The school was opened in 1929. The Second World War forced the school to close in 1942. The school reopened in 1948 after the Second World War ended.

Academic divisions
The university comprises the following colleges:
College of Arts and Sciences 
College of Business 
College of Education 
College of Nursing 
College of Philosophy 
College of Information Technology

The university has a postgraduate program for postgraduate students.
Master of Management 
Master of Philosophy

References

See also

 List of Seventh-day Adventist colleges and universities
 Seventh-day Adventist education
 Seventh-day Adventist theology
 History of the Seventh-day Adventist Church

Universities and colleges affiliated with the Seventh-day Adventist Church
Private universities and colleges in Indonesia